Poumai Naga may refer to:
 Poumai Naga people (Poumai Nagas, Poula Naga people, Poula Nagas, Poula people) - Poumai people
 Poumai Naga language (Poula Naga language, Poumai language) - Poula language